The Roman Catholic Archdiocese of Cagayan de Oro (Latin: Archidioecesis Cagayana) is an archdiocese of the Catholic Church in the Philippines.

It is a metropolitan see on the island of Mindanao, which comprises the civil provinces of Misamis Oriental and Camiguin, as well as the municipality of Malitbog, Bukidnon.

Its seat is located at the Saint Augustine Metropolitan Cathedral in Cagayan de Oro, located beside the Cagayan River.

History

Early history
During the Spanish era, only the Province of Misamis existed, which included the present Provinces of Misamis Oriental and Misamis Occidental, run by the civil government in Cebu. The Recollect missionaries arrived from Cebu and started a new mission in the province.

A civil government of its own only started in 1901, but because one part of it was separated by the Iligan Bay, the government decided to divide the province into two.

Today, the Metropolitan Cathedral of Saint Augustine is one of twelve founded by the Order of Augustinian Recollects in the Philippines.

The whole of Mindanao and Sulu were part of the Diocese of Cebu until 1865, when the western half of the island came under the jurisdiction of the Diocese of Jaro, based in Panay.

Pope Leo XIII then established the Diocese of Zamboanga, separating it from Jaro and making it the first diocese in Mindanao, though Pope Pius X executed this in 1910. From that year on, Cagayan de Oro became a part of the Diocese of Zamboanga.

Establishment
On January 20, 1933, Pope Pius XI, through the Papal bull "Ad maius religionis", divided Mindanao between the Diocese of Zamboanga in the south and a new "Diocese of Cagayan de Oro" in the north, to which he appointed an American Jesuit, James T.G. Hayes of New York City, as its first bishop.

More than a year later, on April 28, 1934, Pope Pius XI promulgated an apostolic constitution with the incipit "Romanorum Pontificum semper", separating the dioceses of Cebu, Calbayog, Jaro, Bacolod, Zamboanga, and Cagayan de Oro from the Ecclesiastical Province of Manila. The same constitution also elevated the diocese of Cebu into an archdiocese while placing all the newly-separated dioceses under a new ecclesiastical province, with Cebu as the new metropolitan see.

Its original territory included the provinces of Surigao, Agusan, Bukidnon, Misamis Oriental, Misamis Occidental, Lanao, and the island of Camiguin. A series of divisions, however, gradually reduced this territory, with the creation of the Diocese of Surigao in 1939 and the Diocese of Ozamiz in 1951.

During the episcopacy of Bishop Hayes, he founded two secondary schools, which are later raised into colleges: the Lourdes Academy for Girls in 1928 (run by the R.V.M. Sisters and raised into College status as Lourdes College in 1947) and the Ateneo de Cagayan for Boys in 1933 (run by the Jesuits and raised into University status as Xavier University – Ateneo de Cagayan in 1958).

Archdiocese
On June 29, 1951, during the thirteenth year of Pope Pius XII, the Papal bull "Quo Phillipina Republica" was decreed in order to serve better and more easily the spiritual needs of the Lord's flock in the Philippine Republic. The bull contained the Pope's decision to create new Dioceses and to constitute new Ecclesiastical Provinces in the Philippines.

The Dioceses of Lingayen, Cáceres (Naga City), Nueva Segovia (Ilocos), Tuguegarao, Legazpi, and Sorsogon, as well as the Prelature Nullius of Batanes and Babuyanes were withdrawn from the Metropolitan Archdiocese of Manila, while the Dioceses of Bacolod, Cagayan de Oro, Capiz, Jaro, Surigao, and Zamboanga, as well as the Prelatures Nullius of Cotabato and Sulu, Davao, and Ozamiz were withdrawn from the Metropolitan Archdiocese of Cebu.

From these Dioceses, four new Ecclesiastical Provinces were constituted, namely: Nueva Segovia, Cáceres, Jaro, and Cagayan de Oro. The Episcopal seats of these dioceses were elevated to the rank and dignity of Metropolitan Archbishops. Henceforth, Hayes became the very first Metropolitan Archbishop of Cagayan de Oro.

Later on, the Apostolic Prefecture of Sulu, the Prelatures Nullius of Marbel, Tagum, Malaybalay, and Iligan, as well as the Dioceses of Butuan and Tandag became suffragans of the newly-elevated "Archdiocese of Cagayan de Oro".

Eventually, four other archdioceses were established: Zamboanga in 1958, Davao in 1970, Cotabato in 1979, and Ozamiz in 1983. At present, there are five ecclesiastical provinces in Mindanao.

The Columban mission and Patrick Cronin
In 1952, the first Columban missionaries arrived in Cagayan de Oro as a response to the Archbishop's invitation, because he felt the dearth of priests who would care for his flock.

In 1956, in order to respond to the growing number of priests in the diocese, the San Jose de Mindanao Seminary was opened, with Fr. Theodore A. Daigler, S.J., as its first rector.

In 1958, the Maria Reyna Hospital was opened and directed by the Sisters of Saint Paul of Chartres.

After long years of service to the people of Cagayan de Oro and with so much effort to put up the foundations of the Archdiocese since his arrival in 1926, Archbishop Hayes, the modest and humble shepherd of Cagayan de Oro for almost half a century, retired in 1971.

On January 12, 1971, Patrick H. Cronin, an Irish Columban missionary and the former Bishop-Prelate of Ozamiz, was installed as the second Archbishop of Cagayan de Oro.

In 1976, through the initiatives of Archbishop Cronin, the House of Friendship, located amidst the slums of Santo Niño in Barangay Lapasan, was opened in order to cater to the needs of the orphans, neglected children, aged, unwed mothers, physically handicapped, refugees, stranded persons, transient indigents, and victims of calamities. It would later be run by the Canossian Daughters of Charity in 1984 and was renamed Balay Canossa.

At the age of 74, after serving the people of Cagayan de Oro with utmost love and care, Archbishop Cronin decided to retire due to old age and settled at Saint Patrick's House on Seminary Hill in Barangay Camaman-an, which he intentionally built as a retirement home and, at the same time, a home for the aged, sick, and incapacitated diocesan priests of the Archdiocese. To this day, priests get together there on Mondays for games, meetings, and prayers.

Recent history
Pope John Paul II later accepted Cronin's resignation as Archbishop, which took effect on January 5, 1988. Jesus B. Tuquib, then-Coadjutor Archbishop, succeeded as the third Archbishop of Cagayan de Oro.

On March 4, 2006, Pope Benedict XVI accepted the resignation of Archbishop Tuquib and, at the same time, nominated Antonio J. Ledesma, then the Bishop-Prelate of Ipil, to succeed him and was installed as the fourth Archbishop of Cagayan de Oro on May 30, 2006.

During Archbishop Ledesma's term, he has led the Catholic Bishops' Conference of the Philippines as Chairman of the Episcopal Commission on Inter-religious Dialogue. He has convened local religious leaders in inter-religious dialogues on different social issues.

On June 23, 2020, Pope Francis accepted the resignation of Archbishop Ledesma and appointed Bishop José A. Cabantan of Malaybalay as the fifth Archbishop of Cagayan de Oro. His installation took place on August 28, 2020, during the Feast Day of Saint Augustine.

Coat of arms
The flaming heart represents Saint Augustine, bishop of Hippo and Doctor of the Church, the patron saint of the cathedral. The gold wavy band symbolizes the Cagayan de Oro River after which the city gets its name. The smoking mountain is Hibok-Hibok, a well-known active and destructive volcano on Camiguin Island, which is within the territory of the archdiocese.

Former coats of arms

Community

Priests
, there are a total of 170 priests (119 diocesan and 51 religious) serving within the jurisdiction of the archdiocese.

Most of them are in the 70 parishes, but there are also others without a parish, either in the seminary or carrying out diocesan or apostolate tasks. Some are outside the archdiocese, either on study-leave, on mission, working in other dioceses, or on-leave from the ministry, and some are retired.

Most of the diocesan priests are members of a society founded by the Venerable Teofilo Camomot: the Society of Saint John Vianney (S.S.J.V.).

There are nine (9) male religious congregations in the archdiocese:
Congregation of the Blessed Sacrament (S.S.S.)
Congregation of the Sacred Stigmata of Our Lord Jesus Christ (C.S.S.)
Franciscan Friars of the Immaculate (F.F.I.)
Missionary Society of Saint Columban (S.S.C.M.E.)
Mission Society of the Philippines (M.S.P.)
Poor Servants of Divine Providence (P.S.D.P.)
Priests of the Sacred Heart of Jesus (S.C.J.)
Society of Jesus (S.J.)
Society of Saint Paul (S.S.P.)

Nuns
Of the 18 religious institutes of women in the archdiocese, one of them is an "institute of contemplative  life".

Angelic Sisters of Saint Paul (A.S.P.)
Augustinian Sisters of Our Lady of Consolation (O.S.A.)
Canossian Daughters of Charity (F.D.C.C.)
Carmelite Missionaries (C.M.) (institute of contemplative life)
Order of the Company of Mary Our Lady (O.D.N.)
Daughters of Saint Paul (F.S.P.)
Franciscan Missionaries of Mary (F.M.M.)
Hijas de Jesús (F.I.)
Missionary Congregation of Mary (M.C.M.)
Order of the Discalced Carmelites (O.C.D.)
Our Lady's Missionaries (O.L.M.)
Religious of the Assumption (R.A.)
Religious of the Good Shepherd (R.G.S.)
Religious Sisters of Mercy (R.S.M.)
Religious of the Virgin Mary (R.V.M.)
Siervas de Nuestra Señora de la Paz (S.N.S.P.)
Sisters of Saint Paul of Chartres (S.P.C.)
Ursuline Missionaries of the Sacred Heart (U.M.S.H.)

Pious associations
These are the groups of women on the way of becoming religious institutes of diocesan right:
Missionary Sisters of the Holy Family (M.S.H.F.)
Theresian Missionary of Mary (T.M.M.)
Sisters of Social Apostolate (S.S.A.)

The M.S.H.F. and the T.M.M. are outgrowths of the original group founded by Camomot and brought by him to Cagayan de Oro: the Daughters of Saint Teresa (D.S.T.), which later moved to Cebu. There is also one lay association, the Teresiana.

The religious sisters engage in various fields of apostolate, such as: running or administering schools, campus ministries, parish work, catechism, family life, hospital work, running orphanages, taking care of young ladies, and others.

Educational institutions

Seminaries
There are two seminaries in the archdiocese: a college seminary and a theological seminary.

San Jose de Mindanao Seminary
Founded by Archbishop Hayes in 1955, the college seminary, named the San Jose de Mindanao Seminary, is mainly for the seminarians of the archdiocese, although it continues to receive seminarians from other ecclesiastical jurisdictions. It has a pre-college year and four main years of college. The seminarians used to study within the halls of the seminary. However, due to lack of personnel and other reasons, they now take their courses at Xavier University – Ateneo de Cagayan. It was first administered by the Jesuits, then by the Columban priests, and now by the diocesan clergy.

Saint John Vianney Theological Seminary
The Saint John Vianney Theological Seminary, opened in 1985, caters mainly to the seminarians of the Ecclesiastical Province of Cagayan de Oro, although it also accepts seminarians from other aforementioned jurisdictions. It has a Spiritual Pastoral Formation Year and four years of Theology. In consortium with Xavier University – Ateneo de Cagayan, it also offers a master's degree in Pastoral Theology. It is run mainly by the Jesuit Fathers, though there are also many diocesan priests teaching in the seminary. Construction was started by Archbishop Cronin and finished by Archbishop Tuquib.

While older priests are products of other institutions, such as the University of Santo Tomas Central Seminary in Manila, the San Jose Major Seminary at the Ateneo de Manila University in Quezon City, the San Carlos Seminary in Makati, and the Saint Francis Xavier Regional Major Seminary (REMASE) of Mindanao in Davao City, most of the younger clergy were educated at the Saint John Vianney Theological Seminary.

Universities, colleges, and schools
Within the Archdiocese, there are two Catholic universities (Xavier University – Ateneo de Cagayan, run by the Jesuits; and Father Saturnino Urios University, run by the Diocese of Butuan) and four colleges (Lourdes, Saint Rita's, and Christ the King, run by the R.V.M. Sisters; and Fatima College in Camiguin, run by the Religious Sisters of Mercy). Most of them were either founded by Archbishop Hayes himself or founded during his time.

There are also 18 Catholic schools, most of which are run by Sisters. A group of Sisters, the Hijas de Jesus, administers the only Chinese Catholic school in Cagayan de Oro, the Kong Hua School (in collaboration with the Lorenzo Ruiz Mission Society). The R.V.M. Sisters run Saint Mary's Academy of Carmen.

Suffragan dioceses

Ordinaries

Metropolitan Archbishops

Timeline of archbishops

Coadjutor Archbishops

Auxiliary Bishops

Affiliated Bishops
Raul B. Dael – Bishop of Tandag (From Saint John Vianney Theological Seminary/Former Vicar General for Clergy of the Archdiocese of Cagayan de Oro)
Severo C. Caermare – Bishop of Dipolog (From Saint John Vianney Theological Seminary)
Alberto S. Uy – Bishop of Tagbilaran (From Saint John Vianney Theological Seminary)
Jose R. Rapadas III – Bishop of Iligan (From Saint John Vianney Theological Seminary)
Cerilo Allan U. Casicas – Bishop of Marbel (Former Director and Professor at Saint John Vianney Theological Seminary)

See also 
 Cagayan de Oro
 Catholic Church in the Philippines
List of Catholic dioceses in the Philippines

References

External links
 
 
 Archdiocese of Cagayan de Oro – GCatholic.org
 Archdiocese of Cagayan de Oro – Catholic Hierarchy

Christian organizations established in 1933
Cagayan de Oro
Roman Catholic dioceses and prelatures established in the 20th century
Archdiocese
1933 establishments in the Philippines
Religion in Misamis Oriental
Cagayan de Oro